In mathematics, a polynomially reflexive space is a Banach space X, on which the space of all polynomials in each degree is a reflexive space.

Given a multilinear functional Mn of degree n (that is, Mn is n-linear), we can define a polynomial p as

(that is, applying Mn on the diagonal) or any finite sum of these. If only n-linear functionals are in the sum, the polynomial is said to be n-homogeneous.

We define the space Pn as consisting of all n-homogeneous polynomials.

The P1 is identical to the dual space, and is thus reflexive for all reflexive X. This implies that reflexivity is a prerequisite for polynomial reflexivity.

Relation to continuity of forms

On a finite-dimensional linear space, a quadratic form x↦f(x) is always a (finite) linear combination of products x↦g(x) h(x) of two linear functionals g and h. Therefore, assuming that the scalars are complex numbers, every sequence xn satisfying g(xn) → 0 for all linear functionals g, satisfies also f(xn) → 0 for all quadratic forms f.

In infinite dimension the situation is different. For example, in a Hilbert space, an orthonormal sequence xn satisfies g(xn) → 0 for all linear functionals g, and nevertheless f(xn) = 1 where f is the quadratic form f(x) = ||x||2. In more technical words, this quadratic form fails to be weakly sequentially continuous at the origin.

On a reflexive Banach space with the approximation property the following two conditions are equivalent:
 every quadratic form is weakly sequentially continuous at the origin;
 the Banach space of all quadratic forms is reflexive.

Quadratic forms are 2-homogeneous polynomials. The equivalence mentioned above holds also for n-homogeneous polynomials, n=3,4,...

Examples 

For the  spaces, the Pn is reflexive if and only if  < . Thus, no  is polynomially reflexive. ( is ruled out because it is not reflexive.)

Thus if a Banach space admits  as a quotient space, it is not polynomially reflexive. This makes polynomially reflexive spaces rare.

The Tsirelson space T* is polynomially reflexive.

Notes

References 

Alencar, R., Aron, R. and S. Dineen (1984), "A reflexive space of holomorphic functions in infinitely many variables", Proc. Amer. Math. Soc. 90: 407–411.
Farmer, Jeff D. (1994), "Polynomial reflexivity in Banach spaces", Israel Journal of Mathematics 87: 257–273. 
Jaramillo, J. and Moraes, L. (2000), "Dualily and reflexivity in spaces of polynomials", Arch. Math. (Basel) 74: 282–293. 
Mujica, Jorge (2001), "Reflexive spaces of homogeneous polynomials", Bull. Polish Acad. Sci. Math. 49:3, 211–222. 

Banach spaces